Khachatur of Taron or Khatchatur Taronatsi (12th century, in Taron, Turuberan, Greater Armenia – 1184, at Haghartsin Monastery) was an Armenian poet, musician and religious figure, who wrote a number of medieval sharakans.

It is known that he was born in Taron and eventually settled in Eastern Armenia during the Zakarid period. During this time, the first few decades of the thirteenth century, the region was enjoying relative prosperity and development. In the 1230s, he was put in charge of the monastery of Haghartsin, in the province of Dzorapor. From Western Armenia he brought with him to Dzorapor many spiritual chants transcribed in the khaz notation. As elsewhere, this system of musical notation was gradually replaced by the system still in use today.

References

13th-century Armenian poets
Armenian musicians
13th-century Armenian people
Armenian male poets
Armenian composers